Indianola is a village in Carroll Township, Vermilion County, Illinois, United States. It is part of the Danville, Illinois Metropolitan Statistical Area. The population was 207 at the 2000 census.

Geography

Demographics

As of the census of 2000, there were 207 people, 79 households, and 57 families residing in the village. The racial makeup of the village was 98.55% White, 0.48% African American, 0.48% Asian, and 0.48% from two or more races.

There were 79 households, out of which 36.7% had children under the age of 18 living with them, 60.8% were married couples living together, 7.6% had a female householder with no husband present, and 27.8% were non-families. 21.5% of all households were made up of individuals, and 10.1% had someone living alone who was 65 years of age or older. The average household size was 2.62 and the average family size was 3.05.

In the village, the population was spread out, with 27.5% under the age of 18, 9.2% from 18 to 24, 27.5% from 25 to 44, 28.0% from 45 to 64, and 7.7% who were 65 years of age or older. The median age was 37 years. For every 100 females, there were 102.9 males. For every 100 females age 18 and over, there were 97.4 males.

The median income for a household in the village was $42,125, and the median income for a family was $44,688. Males had a median income of $33,125 versus $17,250 for females. The per capita income for the village was $16,284. About 6.2% of families and 6.0% of the population were below the poverty line, including 13.3% of those under the age of eighteen and none of those 65 or over.

Notable people 

 Martin B. Bailey, Illinois lawyer and state legislator
 William Parker McKee, president of Shimer College (1897-1930)
 Ryan Drew Thomas, UFC Fighter

References

Villages in Vermilion County, Illinois
Villages in Illinois